The North Sydenham River is a river in the municipalities of Saint Clair (Lambton County) and Chatham-Kent (formerly in Kent County) in Southwestern Ontario, Canada. It is a tributary of the Sydenham River, and is part of the Great Lakes Basin.

It flows first southwest, then southeast, then heads south. The Sydenham River flows via the Chenail Ecarté (The Snye), Lake St. Clair and the Detroit River to Lake Erie.

Tributaries
Source confluence
Bear Creek (right)
Black Creek (left)
Indian Creek (right)
Goodens Creek (right)
Ryans Creek (left)
Running Creek (right)
Otter Creek (left)

References

Rivers of Chatham-Kent
Rivers of Lambton County